Vadym Petrov (born 29 September 1995 in Zaporizhya, Ukraine) is a professional Ukrainian football striker.

Career
Petrov is a product of FC Metalurh Zaporizhya Youth Sportive School.

After playing for Ukrainian clubs in the different levels, in March 2017 he signed a contract with a Finnish club Mikkelin Palloilijat from the Ykkönen.

References

External links
Profile at FFU Official Site (Ukr)

1995 births
Living people
Ukrainian footballers
FC Dynamo-2 Kyiv players
FC Metalurh Zaporizhzhia players
FC Hoverla Uzhhorod players
Ukrainian expatriate footballers
Expatriate footballers in Finland
Mikkelin Palloilijat players
Ukrainian expatriate sportspeople in Finland
MFC Mykolaiv players
Association football forwards